Forhill is a hamlet in the Bromsgrove district, in the English county of Worcestershire, England. The Roman Road Icknield Street passes through the hamlet. It is near Junction 2 of the M42 motorway.

References

Hamlets in Worcestershire
Bromsgrove